The fourth season of Australian reality television series The Block, titled The Block 2011, aired on the Nine Network. Scott Cam returned as host as did John McGrath & Neale Whitaker as judges and Shelley Craft joined the season as "Challenge Master". The season premiered on Monday, 20 June 2011 at 7:00 pm.

Unlike previous series, the fourth season was filmed in Melbourne rather than Sydney, with the four houses to be renovated located in the inner-city suburb of Richmond.

The season was ultimately won by Polly Porter and Warwick "Waz" Jones, who were the only couple to sell their property at auction.

The Block: Unlocked

The Block: Unlocked is a new format hosted by Shelley Craft which shares a personal insight into The Block transformations as the couples guide us through their completed rooms, it also includes behind the scenes footage and footage not seen on TV.

Contestants

Elimination rounds

Green: This couple won an elimination challenge and became a couple on the Block 2011.

Red: This couple failed to win an elimination challenge and did not become a Block couple.

Season Contestants

Score History

Scores

Summary

Judges' scores
 Colour key:
  Highest Score
  Lowest Score

Results

Elimination week

Weeks

Auction

Reception

Ratings
 Colour key:
  – Highest rating episode and week during the series
  – Lowest rating episode and week during the series

 Notes:
  Ratings data is from OzTAM and represents the live and same day average viewership from the 5 largest Australian metropolitan centres (Sydney, Melbourne, Brisbane, Perth and Adelaide).

Notes 
The first week's average was incorrectly coded to include a repeat episode, resulting in a lower figure. Without this error, the average is 1.18 million, and is ranked 19th in the weekly Top 100 programs.
Due to a coding error for Australia's Got Talent, The Block was originally ranked third in nightly figures. With its adjusted figures, Australia's Got Talent was ranked first, therefore relegating The Block to fourth position.
Passed in at auction, not sold

References

2011 Australian television seasons
4